Kerry Peter Walmsley (born 23 August 1973) played three Test matches and two One Day Internationals for New Zealand between 1995 and 2003 as a fast bowler.

In domestic cricket he played for Auckland from 1994–95 to 1999–2000, Otago from 2000–01 to 2002–03, and Auckland again from 2003–04 to 2005–06.

External links
 

1973 births
Living people
New Zealand cricketers
New Zealand One Day International cricketers
New Zealand Test cricketers
Auckland cricketers
Otago cricketers
North Island cricketers